The 1862–63 United States House of Representatives elections were held on various dates in various states between June 2, 1862 and November 3, 1863, during the American Civil War and President Abraham Lincoln's first term. Each state set its own date for its elections to the House of Representatives before the first session of the 38th United States Congress convened on December 7, 1863. The congressional reapportionment based on the 1860 United States Census was performed assuming the seceded states were still in the union, increasing the number of congressional districts to 241. West Virginia was given three seats from Virginia after the former broke away from the latter to rejoin the union as a separate state. The seceded states remained unrepresented and left 58 vacancies. Republicans lost 22 seats and the majority, while Democrats gained 28.

The Civil War to date had been only weakly successful for the Union, but had wrought major, disruptive change in the size and reach of the Federal Government, which before the war had been small and little seen beyond post offices, customs houses in ports, and scattered military posts. The Republican Party was also relatively new, yet had led the Union down a radical path of rapid industrialization and destructive total war.

Voters turned on the administration over its failure to deliver a swift victory over the Confederate rebellion (at times verging on military incompetence), along with rising inflation and new taxes to pay for the war effort, the suspension of habeas corpus, and the introduction of conscription.

Expressing a typical sentiment, the Cincinnati Gazette had editorialized that voters "are depressed by the interminable nature of this war, as so far conducted, and by the rapid exhaustion of the national resources without progress." Short of a majority, Republicans retained control with the support of the Unionist Party. In September 1862, President Lincoln had warned the South that he planned by executive order, and as a war measure, to liberate all slaves in rebelling states as of January 1, 1863. The popularity of emancipation varied by region. It was more popular in New England and areas near the Great Lakes, and less popular in cities with large immigrant populations and in the southern portion of the North.

While Democrats hailed the elections as a repudiation of emancipation, the results did not alter Lincoln's plan or hamper prosecution of the war. In Lincoln's home district of Springfield, Illinois, John T. Stuart, a Democrat and one of Lincoln's former law partners, defeated the Republican incumbent. A fear of an influx of freed slaves competing for jobs and depressing wages, and a desire by white voters to prevent black suffrage, helped drive this result and others.

The sitting House Speaker, Galusha Grow of Pennsylvania, also lost re-election, but he would return to the House 30 years later in 1894. A Speaker of the House would not lose re-election again until 1994.

Election summaries 
The eight Representatives remaining from Tennessee and Virginia in the 37th Congress were absent from the 38th Congress. Other seceded states remained unrepresented, leaving 58 vacancies Upon admission, West Virginia was allotted three Representatives  and during the second session one seat was added for the new state of Nevada.

Reapportionment transpired according to the 1860 Census, under the 1850 Apportionment Act providing a total of 233 seats. A later Act added eight seats, increasing the total to 241.

Special elections 

There were seven special elections during the 37th Congress, and two during the 38th Congress.

37th Congress 

|-
! 
| Joseph Segar
|  | Unionist
| 1861
|  | Incumbent declared not entitled February 11, 1862.Incumbent re-elected March 15, 1862.Unionist hold.
| nowrap | 

|-
! 
| Thomas B. Cooper
|  | Democratic
| 1860
|  | Incumbent died April 4, 1862.New member elected May 24, 1862.Democratic hold.
| nowrap | 

|-
! 
| Charles W. Walton
|  | Republican
| 1860
|  | Incumbent resigned May 26, 1862.New member elected September 8, 1862.Republican hold.
| nowrap | 

|-
! 
| James S. Jackson
|  | Unionist
| 1861
|  | Incumbent resigned December 13, 1861.New member elected October 27, 1862.Unionist hold.
| nowrap | 

|-
! 
| Goldsmith Bailey
|  | Republican
| 1860
|  | Incumbent died May 8, 1862.New member elected November 4, 1862.Republican hold.
| nowrap | 

|-
! 
| Luther Hanchett
|  | Republican
| 1860
|  | Incumbent died November 24, 1862.New member elected December 30, 1862.Republican hold.Successor was also elected to the next term, see below.
| nowrap | 

|-
! 
| Charles H. Upton
|  | Unionist
| 1861
|  | Incumbent invalidated February 27, 1862.New member elected January 15, 1863.Unionist hold.
| nowrap | 

|}

38th Congress 

|-
! 
| Luther Hanchett
|  | Republican
| 1860
|  | Incumbent member-elect died November 23, 1862.New member elected December 30, 1862.Republican hold.Successor was also elected to finish the current term, see above.
| nowrap | 

|-
! 
| Erastus Corning
|  | Democratic
| 1860
|  | Incumbent resigned October 5, 1863.New member elected November 3, 1863.Democratic hold.
| nowrap | 

|-
! 
| William Temple
|  | Democratic
| 1862
|  | Incumbent died May 28, 1863.New member elected November 19, 1863.Unconditional Unionist gain.
| nowrap | 

|}

Alabama 

Alabama elected no members to the next Congress due to its withdrawal during the Civil War.

Arkansas 

Arkansas elected no members to the next Congress due to its withdrawal during the Civil War.

California 

Note: From statehood to 1866, California's representatives were elected state-wide at-large, with the top two vote-getters winning election from 1849 to 1858. In 1860, when California gained a seat, the top three vote-getters were elected.

California elected its members September 2, 1863, after the term began but before the Congress convened.

|-
! rowspan=3 | 
| Timothy Phelps
|  | Republican
| 1861
|  | Incumbent retired.New member elected.Republican hold.
| rowspan=3 nowrap | 

|-
| Aaron A. Sargent
|  | Republican
| 1861
|  | Incumbent retired.New member elected.Republican hold.

|-
| Frederick F. Low
|  | Republican
| 1861
|  | Incumbent retired.New member elected.Republican hold.

|}

Connecticut 

Connecticut elected its members April 6, 1863, after the term began but before the Congress convened.

Colorado Territory 
See non-voting delegates, below.

Delaware 

Delaware elected its sole member November 1, 1862.

|-
! rowspan=3 | 
| George P. Fisher
|  | Unionist
| 1860
|  | Incumbent lost re-election.New member elected.Democratic gain.
| nowrap | 

|}

Dakota Territory 
See non-voting delegates, below.

Florida 

Florida elected no members to the next Congress due to its withdrawal during the Civil War.

Georgia 

Georgia elected no members to the next Congress due to its withdrawal during the Civil War.

Idaho Territory 
See non-voting delegates, below.

Illinois 

Illinois elected its members November 4, 1862.

Indiana 

Indiana elected its members October 14, 1862.

Iowa 

Iowa elected its members October 14, 1862.

Kansas 

Kansas elected its member November 4, 1862.

Kentucky 

Kentucky elected its members August 3, 1863, after the term began but before the Congress convened.

Louisiana 

Although Louisiana had withdrawn from the Union during the Civil War, elections were held on December 3, 1863, for the two congressional districts in portions of the state under Union control. The seats had been vacant since the end of the 36th Congress.

|-
! 
| colspan=3 |Vacant
|  | Seat expired at end of 36th Congress with the withdrawn of Louisiana from the Union.New member elected.Unionist gain.
| 

|-
! 
| colspan=3 | Vacant
|  | Seat expired at end of 36th Congress with the withdrawn of Louisiana from the Union.New member elected.Unionist gain.
| 

|}

Maine 

Maine elected its members September 8, 1862.

Maryland 

Maryland elected its members November 3, 1863, after the term began but before the Congress convened.

Massachusetts 

Massachusetts elected its members November 1, 1862.

|-
! 
| Thomas D. Eliot
|  | Republican
| 1858
| Incumbent re-elected.
| nowrap | 

|-
! 
| James Buffington
|  | Republican
| 1854
|  | Incumbent retired.New member elected.Republican hold.
| nowrap | 

|-
! 
|  | Republican
| 1858
| Incumbent re-elected.
| nowrap | 

|-
! 
|  | Republican
| 1861 (special)
| Incumbent re-elected.
| nowrap | 

|-
! 
|  | Republican
| 1858
| Incumbent re-elected.
| nowrap | 

|-
! 
|  | Republican
| 1858
| Incumbent re-elected.
| nowrap | 

|-
! rowspan=2 | 
|  | People's
| 1861 (special)
|  |Incumbent lost re-election.New member elected.Republican gain.
| rowspan=2 nowrap | 
|-
|  | Republican
| 1858
|  | Incumbent retired.New member elected.Republican loss.

|-
! 
| colspan=3 | Vacant (new seat)
|  | New seat.New member elected.Republican gain.
| nowrap | 

|-
! rowspan=2 | 
| colspan=3 | Vacant
|  | Rep. Goldsmith Bailey died May 8, 1862.New member elected.Republican gain.
| rowspan=2 nowrap | 

|-
|  | Republican
| 1858
|  | Incumbent retired.New member elected.Republican loss.

|-
! 
|  | Republican
| 1856
| Incumbent re-elected.
| nowrap | 

|}

Michigan 

Michigan elected its members November 4, 1862.

|-
! 
| Fernando C. Beaman
| 
| 1860
| Incumbent re-elected.
| nowrap | 

|-
! 
| colspan=3 | None 
|  | New seat.New member elected.Republican gain.
| nowrap | 

|-
! 
| Bradley F. Granger
| 
| 1860
|  | Incumbent lost re-election to a different party.New member elected.Republican hold.
| nowrap | 

|-
! 
| Francis W. Kellogg
| 
| 1858
| Incumbent re-elected.
| nowrap | 

|-
! 
| Rowland E. Trowbridge
| 
| 1860
|  | Incumbent lost re-election.New member elected.Democratic gain.
| nowrap | 

|-
! 
| colspan=3 | None 
|  | New seat.New member elected.Republican gain.
| nowrap | 

|}

Minnesota 

Minnesota elected its members November 4, 1862.

|-
! 
| William Windom
| 
| 1859
| Incumbent re-elected.
| nowrap | 

|-
! 
| Cyrus Aldrich
| 
| 1859
|  | Incumbent retired to run for U.S. senator.New member elected.Republican hold.
| nowrap | 

|}

Mississippi 

Mississippi elected no members to the next Congress due to its withdrawal during the Civil War.

Missouri 

Missouri elected its members November 4, 1862.

Nebraska Territory 
See non-voting delegates, below.

Nevada Territory 
See non-voting delegates, below.

New Hampshire 

New Hampshire elected its members March 10, 1863.

New Mexico Territory 
See non-voting delegates, below.

New Jersey 

New Jersey elected its members November 4, 1862.

New York 

New York elected its members November 4, 1862.  The state lost two seats in reapportionment, going from 33 members to 31.

|-
! 
| Edward H. Smith
|  | Democratic
| 1860
|  | Incumbent retired.New member elected.Democratic hold.
| nowrap | 

|-
! 
| 
| 
| 
| 
|
|-
! 
| 
| 
| 
| 
|
|-
! 
| 
| 
| 
| 
|
|-
! 
| 
| 
| 
| 
|
|-
! 
| 
| 
| 
| 
|
|-
! 
| 
| 
| 
| 
|
|-
! 
| 
| 
| 
| 
|
|-
! 
| 
| 
| 
| 
|
|-
! 
| 
| 
| 
| 
|
|-
! 
| 
| 
| 
| 
|
|-
! 
| 
| 
| 
| 
|
|-
! 
| 
| 
| 
| 
|
|-
! 
| 
| 
| 
| 
|
|-
! 
| 
| 
| 
| 
|
|-
! 
| 
| 
| 
| 
|
|-
! 
| 
| 
| 
| 
|
|-
! 
| 
| 
| 
| 
|
|-
! 
| 
| 
| 
| 
|
|-
! 
| 
| 
| 
| 
|
|-
! 
| 
| 
| 
| 
|
|-
! 
| 
| 
| 
| 
|
|-
! 
| 
| 
| 
| 
|
|-
! 
| 
| 
| 
| 
|
|-
! 
| 
| 
| 
| 
|
|-
! 
| 
| 
| 
| 
|
|-
! 
| 
| 
| 
| 
|
|-
! 
| 
| 
| 
| 
|
|-
! 
| 
| 
| 
| 
|
|-
! 
| 
| 
| 
| 
|
|-
! 
| 
| 
| 
| 
|
|}

North Carolina 

North Carolina elected no members to the next Congress due to its withdrawal during the Civil War.

Ohio 

Ohio elected its members October 14, 1862.

|-
! 
| George H. Pendleton
|  | Democratic
| 1856
| Incumbent re-elected.
| nowrap | 

|-
! 
| John A. Gurley
|  | Republican
| 1858
|  | Incumbent lost re-election.New member elected.Democratic gain.
| nowrap | 

|-
! 
| Clement Vallandigham
|  | Democratic
| 1858 
|  | Incumbent lost re-election.New member elected.Republican gain.
| nowrap | 

|-
! 
| William Allen
|  | Democratic
| 1858
|  | Incumbent retired.New member elected.Democratic hold.
| nowrap | 

|-
! 
| colspan=3 | New district
|  | New district.New member elected.Democratic gain.
| nowrap | 

|-
! 
| Chilton A. White
|  | Democratic
| 1860
| Incumbent re-elected.
| nowrap | 

|-
! rowspan=3 | 
| Richard A. Harrison
|  | Unionist
| 1861 
|  | Incumbent retired.New member elected.Unionist loss.
| rowspan=3 nowrap | 

|-
| Samuel S. Cox
|  | Democratic
| 1856
| Incumbent re-elected.

|-
| Samuel Shellabarger
|  | Republican
| 1860
|  | Incumbent lost renomination.New member elected.Democratic gain.

|-
! 
| colspan=3 | New district
|  | New district.New member elected.Democratic gain.
| nowrap | 

|-
! rowspan=2 | 
| Warren P. Noble
|  | Democratic
| 1860
| Incumbent re-elected.
| rowspan=2 nowrap | 

|-
| Samuel T. Worcester
|  | Republican
| 1861 
|  | Incumbent lost re-election.New member elected.Republican loss.

|-
! 
| James M. Ashley
|  | Republican
| 1858
| Incumbent re-elected.
| nowrap | 

|-
! 
| Valentine B. Horton
|  | Republican
| 1860
|  | Incumbent retired.New member elected.Democratic gain.
| nowrap | 

|-
! 
| Carey A. Trimble
|  | Republican
| 1858
|  | Incumbent lost re-election.New member elected.Democratic gain.
| nowrap | 

|-
! 
| colspan=3 | New district
|  | New district.New member elected.Democratic gain.
| nowrap | 

|-
! 
| Harrison G. O. Blake
|  | Republican
| 1859 
|  | Incumbent retired.New member elected.Democratic gain.
| nowrap | 

|-
! rowspan=3 | 
| Robert H. Nugen
|  | Democratic
| 1860
|  | Incumbent retired.New member elected.Democratic hold.
| rowspan=3 nowrap | 

|-
| James R. Morris
|  | Democratic
| 1860
| Incumbent re-elected.

|-
| William P. Cutler
|  | Republican
| 1860
|  | Incumbent lost re-election.New member elected.Republican loss.

|-
! 
| colspan=3 | New district
|  | New district.New member elected.Democratic gain.
| nowrap | 

|-
! 
| colspan=3 | New district
|  | New district.New member elected.Republican gain.
| nowrap | 

|-
! 
| Sidney Edgerton
|  | Republican
| 1858
|  | Incumbent retired.New member elected.Republican hold.
| nowrap | 

|-
! 
| Albert G. Riddle
|  | Republican
| 1860
|  | Incumbent retired.New member elected.Republican hold.
| nowrap | 

|}

Oregon 

Oregon elected its members June 2, 1862.

Pennsylvania 

Pennsylvania elected its members October 14, 1862.

Rhode Island 

Rhode Island elected its members April 1, 1863, after the term began but before the Congress convened.

South Carolina 

South Carolina elected no members to the next Congress due to its withdrawal during the Civil War.

Tennessee 

Tennessee elected no members to the next Congress due to its withdrawal during the Civil War.

Texas 

Texas elected no members to the next Congress due to its withdrawal during the Civil War.

Utah Territory 
See non-voting delegates, below.

Vermont 

Vermont elected its members September 1, 1863, after the term began but before the Congress convened.

Virginia 

Virginia elected its members May 28, 1863, but they were all disqualified.

|-
! 
| Joseph Segar
|  | Unionist
| 18611862 1862 
|  | Incumbent re-elected but disqualified May 17, 1864.Unionist loss.
| Nowrap | 

|-
! 
| colspan=3 | Vacant
| New member elected but disqualified May 17, 1864.
| nowrap | 

|-
! 
| colspan=3 | Vacant

|-
! 
| colspan=3 | Vacant

|-
! 
| colspan=3 | Vacant

|-
! 
| colspan=3 | Vacant

|-
! 
| Lewis McKenzie
|  | Unionist
| 1863 
|  | Incumbent lost re-election.New member elected but disqualified.Unionist loss.
| nowrap | 

|-
! 
| colspan=3 | Vacant
| New member elected January 5, 1863 but disqualified March 2, 1863.
| nowrap | 

|}

Washington Territory 
See non-voting delegates, below.

West Virginia 

West Virginia elected three representatives on October 22, 1863 after becoming a state on June 20, 1863 but before the Congress convened. It was made up of three districts that previously belonged to Virginia, all of which were vacant before the elections. They were seated on December 7, 1863.

|-
! 
| colspan=3 | Vacant
|  | New seat.New member elected.Unconditional Unionist gain.
| nowrap | 

|-
! 
| colspan=3 | Vacant
|  | New seat.New member elected.Unconditional Unionist gain.
| nowrap | 

|-
! 
| colspan=3 | Vacant
|  | New seat.New member elected.Unconditional Unionist gain.
| nowrap | 

|}

Wisconsin 

Wisconsin elected six members of congress on Election Day, November 4, 1862, picking up two Democratic gains.

Three of seats were newly apportioned. One incumbent was redistricted and won re-election, but died three weeks after the general election. A special election was held December 30, 1862, to replace him.

|-
! 
| John F. Potter
|  | Republican
| 1856
|  | Incumbent lost re-election.New member elected.Democratic gain.
| nowrap | 

|-
! 
| colspan=3 | New district.
|  | New seat.New member elected.Republican gain.
| nowrap | 

|-
! 
| A. Scott Sloan
|  | Republican 
| 1860
|  | Incumbent retired.New member elected.Republican hold.
| nowrap | 

|-
! 
| colspan=3 | New district.
|  | New seat.New member elected.Democratic gain.
| nowrap | 

|-
! 
| colspan=3 | New district.
|  | New seat.New member elected.Democratic gain.
| nowrap | 

|-
! 
| Luther Hanchett
|  | Republican 
| 1860
| Incumbent re-elected.Member-elect died November 23, 1862, leading to two special elections, see above.
| nowrap | 

|}

Non-voting delegates 

|-
! 
| Hiram Pitt Bennet
|  | Conservative Republican
| 1861
| Incumbent re-elected.
| nowrap | 

|-
! 
| John Blair Smith Todd
|  | Democratic
| 1861
|  | Incumbent lost re-election.New delegate elected.Republican gain.Election was later overturned.
| nowrap | 

|-
! 
| colspan=3 | New seat
|  | Territory established.New delegate elected October 31, 1863 in anticipation of territorial status.Unionist gain.Delegate seated February 1, 1864.
| nowrap | 

|-
! 
| Samuel Gordon Daily
|  | Republican
| 1860 
| Incumbent re-elected in 1862.
| nowrap | 

|-
! 
| John Cradlebaugh
|  | Independent
| 1861
|  | Unknown if incumbent retired or lost re-election.New delegate elected in 1862.Republican gain.
| nowrap | 

|-
! 
| John Sebrie Watts
|  | Republican
| 1860 or 1861
|  | Incumbent retired.New delegate elected.Republican hold.
| nowrap | 

|-
! 
| John M. Bernhisel
|  | Independent
| 1850 or 18511858 or 1859 1860–61
| Incumbent re-elected.
| nowrap | 

|-
! 
| William H. Wallace
|  | Republican
| 1860 or 1861
|  | Incumbent retired.New delegate elected.Democratic gain.
| nowrap | 

|}

See also 
 1862 United States elections
 1862–63 United States Senate elections
 37th United States Congress
 38th United States Congress

Notes

References

Bibliography 
 Allardice, Bruce S., “‘Illinois is Rotten with Traitors!’ The Republican Defeat in the 1862 State Election,” Journal of the Illinois State Historical Society, 104 (Spring–Summer 2011), 97–114.
 Carson, Jamie L. et al. "The Impact of National Tides and District-Level Effects on Electoral Outcomes: The U.S. Congressional Elections of 1862–63," American Journal of Political Science, October 2001, Vol. 45 Issue 4, pp 887–898 in JSTOR
 Nevins, Allan. Ordeal of the Union: vol 6. War Becomes Revolution, 1862–1863 (1960)
 Shankman, Arnold. "Francis W. Hughes and the 1862 Pennsylvania Election." Pennsylvania Magazine of History and Biography 1971 95(3): 383–393. 
 Tap, Bruce. "Race, Rhetoric, and Emancipation: the Election of 1862 in Illinois." Civil War History 1993 39(2): 101–125. 
 Voegeli, Jacque. "The Northwest and the Race Issue, 1861–1862," Mississippi Valley Historical Review Vol. 50, No. 2 (September 1963), pp. 235–251 IN jstor

External links 
 Office of the Historian (Office of Art & Archives, Office of the Clerk, U.S. House of Representatives)